

The Berger BX-110 was a prototype light helicopter built in Switzerland in the early 1970s. The single example (registration HB-YAK) was built by Hans Berger, a Swiss inventor and helicopter dealer. It was powered by a Wankel automotive engine and remained on the Swiss civil register until 1994. It was of conventional light helicopter configuration, with pilot and passenger sitting side by side under a large perspex bubble canopy, with the tail rotor carried on a tubular boom. The powerplant and fuel tanks were located behind the cabin, and the three-bladed main rotor had foldable blades. Landing gear was originally of skid type.

Originally powered by a converted NSU Ro 80 Wankel-type automotive engine, Berger later fitted a BMW 6012 turbine to the aircraft, and later still another adapted automotive Wankel engine, this time from a Mazda RX-7. At the time of the latter conversion, the undercarriage was changed to tricycle configuration.

Specifications (final configuration)

References
 
 Jane's All the World's Aircraft 1973-74 p. 188
 Cockpit (December 1989)

See also

1970s Swiss civil utility aircraft
1970s Swiss helicopters
Aircraft first flown in 1974
Rotary-engined aircraft